Dark Alibi is a 1946 American film directed by Phil Karlson featuring Sidney Toler as Charlie Chan. It is also known as Charlie Chan in Alcatraz, Fatal Fingerprints and Fatal Fingertips.

Plot 

Thomas Harley, an ex-convict who served time in prison twenty years ago, is wrongfully arrested for a bank robbery he did not commit. The police have found fingerprints on the crime scene, incriminating Harley, even though he was present at the Carey Theatrical Warehouse at the time of the crime.

The policemen do not believe Harley's explanation, partly because he claims to have been called to the warehouse by a note from an old cellmate by the name of Dave Wyatt, a man who has been dead for eight years. Subsequently, Harley is sentenced to death for the robbery. He goes to prison to wait for his execution.

Harley's daughter June asks private investigator Charlie Chan for help to prove her father's innocence. Hearing about the suspicious circumstances, Chan immediately agrees to take the case.

With only nine days before Harley's execution, Chan starts investigating the suspicious note to Harley, and finds out that it was written on a typewriter belonging to Mrs. Foss, Harley's landlady, who often rents to ex-cons. He talks to the other tenants in the building: the poor Miss Petrie, bookkeeper Mr. Johnson, salesman Mr. Danvers, and showgirl Emily Evans, whose work costume was found in the warehouse near the crime scene. Curiously enough, both Danvers and Evans had been in other cities at the time of bank robberies there.  On the way to the prison to see Harley, Chan, his son Tommy, and the chauffeur Birmingham are shot at. This makes Chan sure that they are on the right track. He believes that the fingerprints at the crime scene must have been placed there by someone else.

When Chan looks into the other robberies he finds that the modus operandi was always the same, and the perpetrators ended up in the same prison. It also turns out the quiet "Miss" Petrie is actually married; her husband is Jimmy Slade, a convict who works in the prison's fingerprint department.

Later Miss Petrie is run over and killed by a truck outside the warehouse, and Johnson is at the scene when Chan arrives. Chan returns to the prison to check out the fingerprint department, and discovers that someone has exchanged the print cards. Miss Petrie's husband Slade hears of Chan's suspicions and attempts to escape, but is wounded when his gun explodes.

Slade dies from his wounds without revealing any information, and Chan demands new prints from everyone living in Harley's building, including Johnson. He discovers that Johnson's prints are all over one of the print cards in the prison.

Chan returns to the warehouse again, and finds the equipment used to forge fingerprints in the truck that ran Petrie over. Chan is discovered by Danvers at the warehouse. It turns out Danvers has killed Johnson to stop him from talking, and now he tries to kill Chan for the same reason. He fails and is arrested for all the robberies. Harley is released from prison. Chan tells Harley that June's boyfriend Hugh Kenzie was the leader of the robbers, and that he framed Harley because Harley opposed his marrying June.

Cast 

 Sidney Toler as Charlie Chan
 Benson Fong as Tommy Chan
 Mantan Moreland as Birmingham Brown
 Ben Carter as Benjamin Brown
 Teala Loring as June Harley
 George Holmes as Hugh Kenzie
 Joyce Compton as Emily Evans
 John Eldredge as Morgan
 Russell Hicks as Warden Cameron
 Tim Ryan as Foggy
 Janet Shaw as Miss Petrie
 Edward Earle as Thomas Harley
 Ray Walker as Danvers
 Milton Parsons as Johnson
 Edna Holland as Mrs. Foss
 Anthony Warde as Jimmy Slade
 George Eldredge as Brand

References

External links 

1946 films
1946 crime drama films
American crime thriller films
American mystery films
American detective films
Films about miscarriage of justice
American black-and-white films
Monogram Pictures films
Articles containing video clips
Films directed by Phil Karlson
1946 mystery films
1940s English-language films
1940s American films